Leonel López González (born 24 May 1994) is a Mexican professional footballer who plays as a midfielder for Liga MX club Tijuana.

Club career

León
López began his official football career when he was bought by Club León from youth club, Yurecuaro F.C. on July 1, 2013. He began his first professional game in the 2014–15 CONCACAF Champions League against Salvadorean Club, Isidro Metapan, though on the bench. López started his first Copa MX game on July 25, 2013, against Dorados. It wasn't until September 20, 2014, that he would debut with Club León against Veracruz at home. Leon won 3 -1.

Toluca
On 13 December 2017, López was loaned to Toluca in a 6-month-deal.

Career statistics

Club

References

External links
 

Living people
1991 births
Association football midfielders
Club León footballers
Deportivo Toluca F.C. players
Club América footballers
Club Universidad Nacional footballers
Liga MX players
Liga Premier de México players
Tercera División de México players
Footballers from Jalisco
Mexican footballers